Marc Goos (born 30 November 1990) is a Dutch racing cyclist who rode most recently for the UCI ProTour team, . He competed in the 2014 Giro d'Italia and finished in 35th position.

Major results

2010
9th Overall Flèche du Sud
2011
1st Overall Vuelta Ciclista a León
7th Overall Rhône-Alpes Isère Tour
2012
3rd Overall Le Triptyque des Monts et Châteaux
5th Overall Tour of China
6th Overall Tour du Poitou-Charentes

References

External links
 

1990 births
Living people
Dutch male cyclists
Sportspeople from Breda
Cyclists from North Brabant